The 2022 Liga 3 Riau or 2022 Aulia Hospital Liga 3 for sponsor reasons, is the fifth season of Liga 3 Riau organized by Asprov PSSI Riau.

Followed by 19 clubs. The winner of this competition will advance to the national round representing Riau Province for promotion to Liga 2.

PS Siak is the defending champion after winning it in the 2021 season.

Teams 
2022 Liga 3 Riau was attended by 19 teams.

Group stage

Group A

Group B

Group C

Group D

Knockout stage 
Wait for the completion of the group stage first.

References

2022 in Indonesian football
Riau